KTVN (channel 2) is a television station in Reno, Nevada, United States, affiliated with CBS. Owned by Sarkes Tarzian, Inc., the station has studios on Energy Way in Reno, and its transmitter is located on Slide Mountain in unincorporated Washoe County.

History

A group of nine Reno residents, headlined by KBET (1340 AM) station manager Robert Stoddard and former KOLO-TV vice president Lee Hirshland, filed on December 22, 1965, for a new channel 2 television station in the city. A construction permit was granted on July 27, 1966. After a delay induced by an unsuccessful legal action from KOLO-TV, which sought to block the grant of the permit, then an objection by radio station KNEV to the location of its transmitter site, KTVN signed on the air on June 4, 1967, as an ABC affiliate. It took over the CBS affiliation on May 10, 1972, replacing previous affiliate KOLO-TV.

During the 1970s, the station operated a satellite station, KEKO-TV (channel 10) in Elko. KEKO signed on April 18, 1973; it was off-the-air from January 24, 1974, to June 27, 1975. On December 23, 1975, Washoe Empire informed the Federal Communications Commission (FCC) that KEKO's transmitter and equipment had been destroyed in a fire; on April 14, 1976, the FCC granted special temporary authority (STA) to Washoe Empire to operate a KTVN translator on channel 10 (at the time, Washoe Empire had made no decision about returning KEKO to the air). On April 8, 1977, at the station's request, the FCC canceled the KEKO license effective March 18. Channel 10 in Elko is currently used by KENV-DT, which formerly operated as a satellite of KRNV-DT until its disaffiliation from NBC on January 1, 2018; it is now a TBD-operated station.

Sarkes Tarzian bought KTVN from Washoe Empire for $12.5 million in 1980.

Programming

Syndicated programming
In addition to the CBS network schedule, syndicated programming on KTVN includes The Ellen DeGeneres Show and Inside Edition, among others.

News operation
KTVN is the only station in the Reno market to not have a midday newscast. KTVN airs the CBS Evening News at 6:00 p.m. and KOLO-TV also airs their national newscast at 6:00 p.m. while KRNV is the only station to air their national newscast at 5:30 p.m. KOLO-TV began competing with KTVN on the 4:30 a.m. newscast which debuted on October 13, 2014.

Notable former on-air staff
 Jodi Applegate
 Mike Galanos
 Tony Kovaleski
 Richard Labunski
 Rene Syler
 Elizabeth Vargas

Technical information

Subchannels
The station's digital signal is multiplexed:

Analog-to-digital conversion
KTVN shut down its analog signal, over VHF channel 2, on June 12, 2009, the official date in which full-power television stations in the United States transitioned from analog to digital broadcasts under federal mandate. The station's digital signal remained on its pre-transition VHF channel 13. Through the use of PSIP, digital television receivers display the station's virtual channel as its former VHF analog channel 2.

Translators

References

External links
 

CBS network affiliates
Scripps News affiliates
Ion Television affiliates
Defy TV affiliates
Television channels and stations established in 1967
1967 establishments in Nevada
TVN